The West Virginia State Yellow Jackets football program represents West Virginia State University in college football at the NCAA Division II level in the Mountain East Conference.  West Virginia State began competing in intercollegiate football in 1942.

History

Conference championships
West Virginia State has won 3 conference championships in school history. Two championships were when they were a member of Central Intercollegiate Athletic Association and one as a member of the West Virginia Intercollegiate Athletic Conference (WVIAC).

See also
 West Virginia State Yellow Jackets
 List of West Virginia State Yellow Jackets football seasons

References

External links
 

 
American football teams established in 1893
1893 establishments in West Virginia